Ningjiang may refer to:

Ningjiang District, in Songyuan, Jilin, China
Ning River, in Guangdong, China